Kosmos 2469 ( meaning Cosmos 2469) was a Russian US-K missile early warning satellite which was launched in 2010 as part of the Russian Space Forces' Oko programme. The satellite was designed to identify missile launches using optical telescopes and infrared sensors.

Kosmos 2469 was launched from Site 16/2 at Plesetsk Cosmodrome in Russia. A Molniya-M carrier rocket with a 2BL upper stage was used to perform the launch, which took place at 17:01 UTC on 30 September 2010. The launch successfully placed the satellite into a molniya orbit. It subsequently received its Kosmos designation, and the international designator 2010-049A. The United States Space Command assigned it the Satellite Catalog Number 37170.

It was the last launch of a US-K satellite and the last launch of a Molniya-M rocket.

On 15 October 2022, Kosmos 2469 re-entered the atmosphere.

See also

List of Kosmos satellites (2251–2500)
List of R-7 launches (2010–2014)
2010 in spaceflight

References

External links
Video of the launch from Vesti.ru

Kosmos satellites
Spacecraft launched in 2010
Spacecraft which reentered in 2022
Oko
Spacecraft launched by Molniya-M rockets